Mike Miello is a former American football coach. He served as head football coach at William Paterson University in Wayne Township, New Jersey from 2005 to 2007, compiling a record of 11–19. After leaving William Paterson, he returned to Hackensack High School before retiring from coaching in 2011.

Head coaching record

College

References

External links
 William Paterson profile

Year of birth missing (living people)
Living people
Columbia Lions football coaches
Rhode Island Rams football coaches
Rhode Island Rams football players
Rutgers Scarlet Knights football coaches
Seton Hall University alumni
William Paterson Pioneers football coaches
High school football coaches in New Jersey
American football tight ends